Josephite Community Aid (also JCA or Jcaid) was a charity organisation based in Sydney, Australia, which, through the work of young volunteers, provides assistance to newly arrived refugee migrants, people facing poverty, mental disability, underprivilege and other special needs. JCA was founded in 1986 and relied on donations and the work of volunteers.

History and community work
JCA (originally named "VCA" from Vincentian Community Aid) invited young people to serve the poor and marginalised. It was founded by Sister Maria Sullivan RSJ, who approached friends in 1986 with ideas for forming a group to help the poor and underprivileged with the assistance of young volunteers.

The group attracted a wide range of benefactors and young volunteers and found a particular mission working among the waves of refugee intakes reaching Australia, from war zones such as Lebanon, Yugoslavia, Afghanistan and Sudan. With the support of the Sisters of Saint Joseph, the Australian order of nuns founded by Saint Mary MacKillop, the group committed itself to aiding people who are poor and underprivileged through utilizing the talents and dedication of young people.

Recognition
Representatives of Josephite Community Aid were invited to participate in the canonisation of St Mary MacKillop in Rome in 2010, with co-ordinator Adrian Thompson representing Australia in the procession of gifts.<ref>[http://www.smh.com.au/national/from-rome-to-fitzroy-all-hail-st-mary-mackillop-20101017-16p44.html From Rome to Fitzroy, all hail St Mary MacKillop]; Sydney Morning Herald; 18 October 2010</ref>

JCA featured in the documentary Mary MacKillop: Soul of the Sunburnt Country'', produced by Albert Street Productions and Sisters of St Joseph of the Sacred Heart.

References

Charities based in Australia
Organizations established in 1986
Organisations based in Sydney
Sisters of St Joseph of the Sacred Heart
Catholic charities
Social welfare charities
Catholic Church in Australia
1986 establishments in Australia
Non-profit organisations based in New South Wales